Florin Nebunu (born April 21, 1987, in Bucharest, Romania) is a Romanian aerobic gymnast. He won three world championships medals (one gold, one silver, and one bronze) and two European championships medals (one gold and one bronze).

References

External links

1987 births
Living people
Gymnasts from Bucharest
Romanian aerobic gymnasts
Male aerobic gymnasts
Medalists at the Aerobic Gymnastics World Championships